Afropoecilia is a genus of moths in the family Tortricidae. It consists of only one species, Afropoecilia kituloensis, which is found in Tanzania.

Description
The wingspan is 14–17 mm. The forewings are greyish white, suffused with fuscous along the dorsum. The hindwings are greyish white, with fuscous transverse striae.

Etymology
The specific name refers to the Kitulo Plateau, the type locality.

References

Cochylini
Monotypic moth genera
Moths of Sub-Saharan Africa
Endemic fauna of Tanzania
Taxa named by Leif Aarvik